Ennio Falco (born 3 January 1968) is a former Italian sport shooter and Olympic champion. He won a gold medal in skeet shooting in the 1996 Summer Olympics in Atlanta.

Biography
Falco has three silver medals from the World Championships in Skeet Shooting, from 1997, 2001 and 2005, as well as bronze medals from 1994 and 2002.

Olympic results

See also
World Cup Multi-Medalists

References

External links
 
 

1968 births
Living people
Italian male sport shooters
Skeet shooters
Olympic shooters of Italy
Olympic gold medalists for Italy
Shooters at the 1996 Summer Olympics
Shooters at the 2000 Summer Olympics
Shooters at the 2004 Summer Olympics
Shooters at the 2008 Summer Olympics
Olympic medalists in shooting
Shooters at the 2012 Summer Olympics
Medalists at the 1996 Summer Olympics
Mediterranean Games gold medalists for Italy
Competitors at the 2005 Mediterranean Games
Mediterranean Games medalists in shooting
Shooters of Gruppo Sportivo Forestale